Phyxia was a town of ancient Greece on the island of Cos.

References

Populated places in the ancient Aegean islands
Former populated places in Greece
Kos